Innermission was the first major label release for the B.E. Taylor Group, released in 1982 on MCA Records (as MCA-5335).

Track listing
"Never Hold Back" - 5:03  	    	
"Stand Up for Love" - 3:22	  	
"I Like the Way I Feel" - 4:32 	  	
"Be My Baby" - 3:24 	  	
"Not Enough Love" - 5:13 	  	
"Just Like in the Movies" - 5:12	  	  	
"Under the Rug" - 4:12 	  	
"Makin' My Move" - 4:06 	  	
"On and On" - 4:37

Produced by Mark Avsec and Donnie Iris for the Belkin / Maduri Organization.
Executive Producer - Carl Maduri.

All tracks written by B.E. Taylor except "Be My Baby" (a cover of the Ronettes 1963 #2 hit) written by Ellie Greenwich, Jeff Barry and Phil Spector.

1982 debut albums
Albums produced by Mark Avsec
B. E. Taylor albums
MCA Records albums